The Linguistic Society of America (LSA) is a learned society for linguistics founded in December 1924. At the first meeting, the LSA membership elected Hermann Collitz as their first president. Since then, there have been  presidencies, with  different presidents. Under the constitution and bylaws of the organization, the president of the LSA serves for a one-year term. The president serves as chair of the executive committee and has the power to appoint a number of positions subject to executive committee approval.

The president serves for one year. A candidate is elected by the membership as vice-president of the LSA which also carries the distinction of president-elect. The candidate serves as vice-president for one year and then assumes the office of president at the end of the annual meeting. The candidate then serves as president for one year. Upon leaving the office, the former president serves a one-year term on the Executive Committee. Should the sitting president prematurely leave office, the previous president completes the term.

 the president of the LSA is Laurence Horn.

List of presidents of the Linguistic Society of America 
 1925: Hermann Collitz
 1926: Maurice Bloomfield
 1927: Carl Darling Buck
 1928: Franz Boas
 1929: Charles H. Grandgent
 1930: Eduard Prokosch
 1931: Edgar H. Sturtevant
 1932: George Melville Bolling
 1933: Edward Sapir
 1934: Franklin Edgerton
 1935: Leonard Bloomfield
 1936: George T. Flom
 1937: Carl Darling Buck
 1938: Louis Herbert Gray
 1939: Charles C. Fries
 1940: Alfred Kroeber
 1941: Roland Grubb Kent
 1942: Hans Kurath
 1943: Fred N. Robinson
 1944: Kemp Malone
 1945: Yuen Ren Chao
 1946: E. Adelaide Hahn
 1947: Albrecht Goetze
 1948: Hayward Keniston
 1949: Murray B. Emeneau
 1950: Einar Haugen
 1951: Joshua Whatmough
 1952: George S. Lane
 1953: Bernard Bloch
 1954: Charles F. Voegelin
 1955: Zellig Harris
 1956: Roman Jakobson
 1957: W. Freeman Twaddell
 1958: Henry M. Hoenigswald
 1959: Harry Hoijer
 1960: George L. Trager
 1961: Kenneth L. Pike
 1962: Albert H. Marckwardt
 1963: Mary R. Haas
 1964: Charles Hockett
 1965: Yakov Malkiel
 1966: J. Milton Cowan
 1967: William G. Moulton
 1968: Eugene A. Nida
 1969: Archibald A. Hill
 1970: Charles A. Ferguson
 1971: Eric P. Hamp
 1972: Dwight L. Bolinger
 1973: Winfred P. Lehmann
 1974: Morris Halle
 1975: Thomas A. Sebeok
 1976: Rulon S. Wells
 1977: Joseph H. Greenberg
 1978: Peter Ladefoged
 1979: William Labov
 1980: Ilse Lehiste
 1981: Fred W. Householder
 1982: Dell H. Hymes
 1983: Arthur S. Abramson
 1984: Henry R. Kahane
 1985: Victoria A. Fromkin
 1986: Barbara H. Partee
 1987: Elizabeth C. Traugott
 1988: Calvert Watkins
 1989: William Bright
 1990: Robert Austerlitz
 1991: Charles J. Fillmore
 1992: Arnold M. Zwicky
 1993: Lila R. Gleitman
 1994: Kenneth L. Hale
 1995: Emmon Bach
 1996: James D. McCawley
 1997: Janet Dean Fodor
 1998: D. Terence Langendoen
 1999: Joan Bresnan
 2000: David Perlmutter
 2001: Walt Wolfram
 2002: Frederick J. Newmeyer
 2003: Ray Jackendoff
 2004: Joan Bybee
 2005: Mark Aronoff
 2006: Sally McConnell-Ginet
 2007: Stephen R. Anderson
 2008: Ellen Prince
 2009: Sarah Thomason
 2010: David Lightfoot
 2011: Sandra Chung
 2012: Keren Rice
 2013: Ellen Kaisse
 2014: Joan Maling
 2015: John Rickford
 2016: Alice Harris
 2017: Larry Hyman
 2018: Penelope Eckert
 2019: Brian Joseph
 2020: Marianne Mithun
 2021: Laurence Horn
 2022: John Baugh

See also 
List of presidents of the American Philological Association

Notes

References 

 
 

Linguists
Lists of people by occupation